Phoebis neocypris, the tailed sulphur, is a butterfly in the family Pieridae. It is native to Mexico, Central America, and South America. There is a record for one stray in southern Texas. The habitat consists of tropical areas, especially in mid-elevation forests as well as open and disturbed areas.

Males are orange and females are whitish or yellowish. Both have a triangular extension on each hindwing. Adults are on wing all year round in Mexico and Central America. They are on wing in September in southern Texas. They feed on flower nectar of various flowers, including Lantana and Impatiens species.

The larvae feed on fresh leaves of Cassia species.

Subspecies
The following subspecies are recognised:
 Phoebis neocypris neocypris (Brazil)
 Phoebis neocypris rurina C. & R. Felder, 1861 (Mexico to Brazil, Venezuela, Colombia, Peru, Ecuador)
 Phoebis neocypris virgo (Butler, 1870) (Mexico, Guatemala, Costa Rica)

References

Coliadinae
Butterflies of North America
Butterflies of Central America
Pieridae of South America
Lepidoptera of Brazil
Fauna of the Amazon
Butterflies described in 1823